Aistersheim is a municipality in the district of Grieskirchen in the Austrian state of Upper Austria.

Geography
Aistersheim lies in the Hausruckviertel. About 26 percent of the municipality is forest, and 67 percent is farmland.

References

Cities and towns in Grieskirchen District